Stuart Alan Rice (born January 6, 1932) is an American theoretical chemist and physical chemist. He is well known as a theoretical chemist who also does experimental research, having spent much of his career working in multiple areas of physical chemistry. He is currently the Frank P. Hixon Distinguished Service Professor Emeritus at the University of Chicago.  During his tenure at the University of Chicago, Rice has trained more than 100 Ph.D. students and postdoctoral researchers.  He received the National Medal of Science in 1999.

Education and career

Stuart Rice attended the Bronx High School of Science, received his bachelor's degree in 1952 from Brooklyn College, and earned his master's and doctorate from Harvard University in 1954 and 1955, respectively.  He was almost unable to attend graduate school due to contracting tuberculosis, but was cured of the disease through an experimental treatment of isoniazid and streptomycin.  He remained at Harvard as a Junior Fellow for three years, although he spent the last two years of the fellowship doing research work at Yale University's Chemistry Department.  After the fellowship, he joined the faculty of The University of Chicago in 1957, where he has remained since.

Rice has served the university in a wide variety of capacities during his fifty-seven year tenure.  He served as the director of the James Franck Institute (the university's center for physical chemistry and condensed matter physics) from 1961 to 1967.  He was Chairman of the Department of Chemistry from 1971 to 1976 and was Dean of the Physical Sciences Division from 1981 to 1995.  He served as Dean for the Toyota Technological Institute at Chicago from October 2006 through October 2010 and as Interim President of the Institute from October 2010 to April 2013.

In addition to his work at the University, he is currently on the Board of Governors at Tel Aviv University and has served as editor for the journals Chemical Physics Letters and Advances in Chemical Physics, and co-authored several physical chemistry textbooks with Stephen Berry and John Ross.

Research

Stuart Rice began his scientific career as a high school student and published on this work.  He completed his doctoral dissertation under Paul Doty, contributing to the then-emerging field of DNA research; the project shared both experimental and theoretical components, which became a hallmark of his later work.

During his time at Yale, Stuart Rice began to study the transport properties of liquids.  He helped to determine the properties of liquid noble gases and methane, while also exploring the theoretical background of transport in liquids as well, comparing the results to simulations of Lennard-Jones fluids.

Following this work he helped to develop the theory of electronic excitations (excitons) in molecular crystals and liquids, eventually moving into the area of radiationless molecular transitions, beginning his own experimental work after the development of the Bixon-Jortner model, while also working with collaborators on extending the theoretical model of these transitions.  This research led him to investigate the effects of quantum chaos on excited molecules, and to couple the developing model of transitions with quantum chaos in order to attain control of the transition of excited molecules. This led to the field of Coherent control, quantum control through laser excitation, which was developed by other scientists at the University of Chicago.

At the same time, he also began work on understanding the electrical properties of liquid metals, where the lack of translational orders frustrated attempts to understand their electronic band structure.  The discrepancy between the dielectric results of reflectivity and ellipsometry data of liquid mercury led to work on the nature of conductivity at the liquid-vapor surface of liquid metal, ultimately showing that the existence of ion inhomogeneities at the interface led to electronic changes in the bulk liquid that persist for several atomic diameters into a liquid.

Smaller research topics that Rice has published on included work on the chemistry of water, the theory of freezing liquids, the properties of monolayers on liquids, and confined colloidal systems, amongst others.

Honors and awards

Rice's most prestigious award is the National Medal of Science, the highest scientific prize awarded in the United States, in 1999. He was awarded the Wolf Prize in Chemistry in 2011, along with Krzysztof Matyjaszewski and Ching Tang. He is a Fellow of both the National Academy of Sciences and the American Academy of Arts and Sciences, and a member of the American Philosophical Society. In 1970 Rice was awarded the Llewellyn John and Harriet Manchester Quantrell Award for Excellence in Undergraduate Teaching, the nation’s oldest prize for undergraduate teaching, a highly esteemed faculty award at The University of Chicago.

Impact

Over the course of his long career Rice has shaped much debate on theoretical physical chemistry.  He is cited on the National Medal of Science "for changing the very nature of modern physical chemistry through his research, teaching and writing, using imaginative approaches to both experiment and theory that have inspired a new generation of scientists."  With over 100 doctoral students to his credit, Stuart Rice has had a great impact on the field of physical chemistry simply through the number of research scientists he has trained. Theoretical chemist David Tannor, who is the Hermann Mayer Professorial Chair in the Department of Chemical Physics at the Weizmann Institute of Science in Israel, did his post-doc work with Stuart Rice and David W. Oxtoby at the University of Chicago.

Personal life

Rice is also famous on campus for eating lunch almost every weekday at the university's Quadrangle Club restaurant (a faculty club), where he has dined over 9,000 times.  Rice is known to sit at the head of the Chemistry table, not because he is the most senior member of the department, but because he is very tall.

Rice was married to Marian Coopersmith from 1952 until her death in 1994.

References

External links
Stuart Rice Profile
Guide to the Stuart Alan Rice Papers 1947-2004 at the University of Chicago Special Collections Research Center

1932 births
Members of the United States National Academy of Sciences
Living people
Jewish American scientists
Jewish chemists
Argonne National Laboratory people
National Medal of Science laureates
Harvard University alumni
Yale University alumni
Scientists from New York City
American physical chemists
Theoretical chemists
Tel Aviv University people
University of Chicago faculty
Wolf Prize in Chemistry laureates
Academic journal editors
Brooklyn College alumni
The Bronx High School of Science alumni
Members of the Royal Irish Academy
21st-century American Jews
Members of the American Philosophical Society